James H. Madison is an American writer who is an emeritus professor at the Indiana University.

Career
Previously, he has served as a Fulbright professor at Hiroshima University and the University of Kent.

In 2020, The Ku Klux Klan in the Heartland was reviewed by The Herald-Times and others.

Books
 The Indiana Way: A State History (1986)
 Eli Lilly, a Life, 1885–1977 (1989)
 The Ku Klux Klan in the Heartland (2001)
 Slinging Doughnuts for the Boys (2007)
 World War II: A History in Documents (2009)
 Hoosiers: A New History of Indiana (2014)

Awards and recognition
 Sylvia E. Bowman Award (1994)
 Fulbright Award (1997)
 Bicentennial Medal (2020)
 Indiana Authors Award

References

American writers
Indiana University faculty
Living people
Year of birth missing (living people)